Rashid Ramzi (born July 17, 1980) is a Moroccan-Bahraini track and field athlete competing internationally for Bahrain in the 800 metres and 1500 metres.  Ramzi was investigated by the IAAF after the 2008 Summer Olympics and was stripped of his gold medal for doping.

Ramzi was born in Safi, Morocco.  After transferring to Bahrain, he ascended to the top of the Asian scene, winning gold medals at the Asian Athletics Championships and the 2002 Asian Games. He set an Asian indoor record over 800 metres to take the silver at the 2004 IAAF World Indoor Championships—his first global medal—and took part in the 2004 Athens Olympics. He reached the peak of his discipline the following year by becoming both the 800 m and 1500 m champion at the 2005 World Championships in Athletics – the first man to ever do such a double at the competition.

He failed to retain his titles at the 2007 World Championships, but still took the silver medal over 1500 m. At the 2008 Summer Olympics he was the recipient of the first ever medal for Bahrain at the Olympics – winning the 1500 m gold medal. However, his result did not stand and he was excluded from the sport for two years after his test came back positive for the banned blood-boosting substance CERA.

Career

Early competition and transfer
Ramzi was raised in Safi, and competed internationally for Morocco, winning the 1500 metres silver medal at the 1999 African Junior Athletics Championships and then winning at the national championships in 2001. until he joined the Bahraini armed forces and gained citizenship in 2002.

Following the nationality transfer, he began competing for Bahrain immediately – he won silver at the 2002 Asian Athletics Championships and then took the 1500 m gold at the 2002 Asian Games. He scored three 1500 m gold medals at regional championships in 2003, winning at the Pan Arab Athletics Championships, the Gulf Cooperation Council Championships, and beating all opposition at the 2003 Asian Athletics Championships.

The 2004 season saw him break through onto the global scene – he won 800 metres and 1500 m golds at the 2004 Asian Indoor Athletics Championships (setting an Asian record at the shorter distance) and then took the silver medal at the 2004 IAAF World Indoor Championships the following month, improving his 800 m area record and just finishing behind Mbulaeni Mulaudzi. Competing on the European circuit, he took his first Golden League win in the 1500 m at the Golden Gala in Rome. Later that year, he represented his adopted country at the 2008 Summer Olympics for the first time and he reached the semi-finals of the 1500 m at the 2004 Athens Olympics.

Double world champion
At the 2005 World Championships in Athletics, Ramzi repeated the 1964 accomplishment of Peter Snell to win gold medals in the 800 m and 1500 m at the same competition in a global competition (World Championship or Summer Olympics).

He followed this with a bronze medal at the 2006 Asian Games and upgraded his next medal to the silver medal in the 1500 m at the 2007 World Championships. Ramzi won the gold at the 2008 Beijing Summer Olympics the next year but he was later stripped of the Olympic title.

Doping scandal
In April 2009, the Bahrain Olympic Committee reported that Ramzi tested positive for doping at the Beijing Games.  Ramzi tested positive for CERA, an advanced version of the blood-boosting drug EPO.  Ramzi’s backup “B” sample was tested on June 18, 2009 and in July 2009 it was announced Ramzi's "B" sample had tested positive as well.  In November 2009, Ramzi was stripped of his gold medal.

He spends much of his time in Morocco to train at high altitude (the highest point in Bahrain is only 440 ft. above sea level).

Personal bests

Achievements

See also
List of doping cases in athletics

References

External links

 

1980 births
Living people
People from Safi, Morocco
Bahraini male middle-distance runners
Moroccan male middle-distance runners
Olympic athletes of Bahrain
Competitors stripped of Summer Olympics medals
Athletes (track and field) at the 2004 Summer Olympics
Athletes (track and field) at the 2008 Summer Olympics
World Athletics Championships medalists
Asian Games medalists in athletics (track and field)
Athletes (track and field) at the 2002 Asian Games
Athletes (track and field) at the 2006 Asian Games
Athletes (track and field) at the 2014 Asian Games
Doping cases in athletics
Bahraini sportspeople in doping cases
Naturalized citizens of Bahrain
Moroccan emigrants to Bahrain
Bahraini people of Moroccan descent
Asian Games gold medalists for Bahrain
Asian Games silver medalists for Bahrain
Asian Games bronze medalists for Bahrain
Medalists at the 2002 Asian Games
Medalists at the 2006 Asian Games
Medalists at the 2014 Asian Games
World Athletics Championships winners